Wilfred William John Marriott (born 11 April 1994) is an English former first-class cricketer.

The son of Harry Marriott and The Hon. Dinah Lilian Douglas-Home, he was born at Westminster in April 1994. His grandfather was William Douglas Home, the brother of Alec Douglas-Home, the former Prime Minister of the United Kingdom. Marriott was educated at Radley College, before going up to Oxford Brookes University. While studying at Oxford Brookes, he played first-class cricket for Oxford UCCE and MCCU in 2013 and 2014, making three appearances against Worcestershire, Nottinghamshire and Warwickshire. He scored 139 runs in his three matches, at an average of 34.75 and with a high score of 81, his only first-class half century.

Notes and references

External links

1994 births
Living people
People from Westminster
English people of Scottish descent
People educated at Radley College
Alumni of Oxford Brookes University
English cricketers
Oxford MCCU cricketers